Forest & Bird, also known by its formal name as the Royal Forest and Bird Protection Society of New Zealand, is an environmental organisation specialising in the protection and conservation of New Zealand's indigenous flora and fauna and unique wild places and natural ecosystems.
Forest & Bird consists of 47 branches located in urban and rural centres throughout New Zealand. Branches are actively engaged in conservation projects and advocacy on a community, regional and national basis. Forest & Bird has offices and staff located in Auckland, Christchurch, Wellington, Nelson and Dunedin. Forest & Bird publishes a quarterly magazine Forest & Bird, one of New Zealand's definitive natural history and conservation publications.

Forest & Bird has published a comprehensive commentary book on environmental law in New Zealand. Forest & Bird are also actively engaged in advocating and lobbying for resource management law and practices to more consistently protect ecosystems.

History 

Forest & Bird was founded as the Native Bird Protection Society in 1923. Later renamed as the Royal Forest and Bird Protection Society of New Zealand, it has consistently advocated conservation issues, particularly for forested land.

Val Sanderson is acknowledged as the founder of Forest & Bird. In 1921, after his return from the First World War, the then Captain Val Sanderson was angered that the Kapiti Island wildlife reserve was unfenced and extensively damaged by cattle, sheep and goats. Sanderson campaigned for better management of Kapiti Island and succeeded in having it re-dedicated as a Wildlife Reserve. After this success, Sanderson held a public meeting in March 1923 which established the Native Bird Protection Society with Sir Thomas Mackenzie as the Society's first President. The New Zealand Forestry League, a forest conservation group already existed but it gradually died out. In 1935 Mackenzie and Sanderson renamed the society the Forest and Bird Protection Society of New Zealand. Sanderson drove an expansion of the society's range of interests into such areas as soil erosion and use of native trees for soil stabilisation. He became the president in 1933 a position which he held until his death in 1945 aged 79.

Until the 1970s, the Royal Forest and Bird Protection Society remained the only New Zealand environmental group. However, in October 1971 the New Zealand Government proposed to harvest large areas of native South Island lowland beech forest with half the cleared area to be converted to exotic Pinus radiata. Along with the Save Manapouri campaign, the native forest harvesting prompted more public awareness of conservation and the formation of new environmental groups such as the Beech Forest Action Committee. In response to the native forest harvesting, on 4 July 1975 Forest & Bird and Beech Forest Action Committee started the Maruia Declaration as a public petition demanding an end to native forest logging and legal recognition of native forests. The Maruia Declaration was submitted to the New Zealand Government in 1977.

From 2005 the society has held an annual poll Bird of the Year, voted on by the public. Winners to date include the kākāpō, the tūī and the New Zealand long-tailed bat.

In 2021, all proceeds from Lorde's Te Ao Mārama EP went to Forest & Bird as well as the Te Hua Kawariki Charitable Trust.

In April 2022, Nicola Toki took over from Kevin Hague as Chief Executive of Forest & Bird.

Campaigns 
1970s – Lake Manapouri
1980s −1990s Native forest conservation
2006 –  Petition to increase protection of the New Zealand sea lion
Living Rivers
South Island High Country
Dawn Chorus (Terrestrial Biodiversity)
2004 Marine Conservation – the Best Fish Guide. Since 2004, Forest & Bird have published the Best Fish Guide which listed 62 commercial fisheries, rated according to the contribution to a healthy marine environment. The 2004 guide considered that none of the species of fish documented were ecologically safe to catch and eat.
2009 – 2010: Preventing large-scale irrigation schemes in the Mackenzie Basin
2009 – A campaign to save NZ's conservation areas from being mined.
2009 – A campaign to save NZ's iconic rivers from being dammed.
2011 – 2012 Opposition to the Escarpment Mine Project on the Denniston Plateau
2008 – 2012 Successfully opposing the damming of the Mōkihinui River

Aims 
The society has the following aims:

To take all reasonable steps within the power of the Society for the preservation and protection of the indigenous flora and fauna and natural features of New Zealand, for the benefit of the public including future generations.
Without affecting the generality of the main objects, the Society shall have the following ancillary objects:
To spread knowledge and encourage appreciation of our native flora and fauna, their aesthetic, scientific, cultural and recreational values.
To educate the public of all age groups regarding the importance and urgent need for protection of these natural resources.
To meet the vital need to conserve the environment free from pollution.
To advocate the protection of indigenous species, their habitats and ecosystems.
To advocate the creation and the preservation of protected natural areas, reserves and National Parks in public ownership and/or control.
To establish and administer reserves and sanctuaries for the preservation of New Zealand's indigenous ecosystems.
To advocate the destruction of introduced species harmful to New Zealand's flora and fauna.

Attitudes 

Perceptions of Forest & Bird are varied. While the group is one of the most well-known mainstream environmental groups of the country, it has also come under criticism, such as in 2010 when Prime Minister John Key accused them of engaging in "predictable scaremongering" when the group warned that a yet unreleased government report proposed to allow mining in 7000ha of high-value conservation land in Paparoa National Park, Great Barrier Island and the Coromandel Peninsula. Key also labelled news coverage quoting Forest & Bird's revelations of the Government's intentions for mining conservation land as "hysterical".

A week later, as predicted by Forest & Bird, the Government released the "Schedule 4 stocktake" proposal to open up 7058 hectares of protected conservation land for mining. Parts of the Coromandel Peninsula, Great Barrier Island, and parts of Paparoa National Park were proposed for removal from Schedule Four of the Crown Minerals Act 1991, which otherwise prevents mining. Journalist John Armstrong commented that "Forest and Bird knocked the Government sideways with leaked information revealing the extent of National's plans to open up land currently off limits to mining companies" and that the Government was suffering from hysteria if any one was.

After 40,000 people marched in Auckland in protest against the proposal, and after the vast majority of 37,552 public submissions opposed the proposal, the Government announced that no conservation land would be removed from Schedule 4 to allow mining.

Publications
Harris, Rob (ed.) (2004). Handbook of Environmental Law (1st ed.). Wellington: Royal Forest and Bird Protection Society of New Zealand Inc., . The work has been described as "a comprehensive guide to New Zealand's environmental law".

References

External links
Forest & Bird
Forest & Bird at Facebook

Animal welfare organisations based in New Zealand
Nature conservation organisations based in New Zealand
Charities based in New Zealand
Organizations established in 1923
1923 establishments in New Zealand
1923 in the environment
Forest conservation organizations
Bird conservation organizations
Organisations based in New Zealand with royal patronage